was an  destroyer of the Imperial Japanese Navy. Her name means "Clear Moon (in Autumn)". Suzutsuki is best known for her participation in Operation Ten-Go as one of the battleship Yamato'''s eight escort ships, where her bow was blown off by an American torpedo. Suzutsuki survived the battle, and escaped American forces by reversing all the way back to port. She was used as a breakwater until 20 November 1945, when her name was struck from the naval register and she was sold for scrap soon after.

Design and description
The Akizuki-class ships were originally designed as anti-aircraft escorts for carrier battle groups, but were modified with torpedo tubes and depth charges to meet the need for more general-purpose destroyer. Her crew numbered 300 officers and enlisted men.

The ships had two Kampon geared steam turbines, each driving one propeller shaft, using steam provided by three Kampon water-tube boilers.

The main armament of the Akizuki class consisted of eight Type 98  dual purpose guns in four twin-gun turrets, two superfiring pairs fore and aft of the superstructure. They carried four Type 96  anti-aircraft guns in two twin-gun mounts. The ships were also armed with four  torpedo tubes in a single quadruple traversing mount; one reload was carried for each tube. Their anti-submarine weapons comprised six depth charge throwers for which 72 depth charges were carried.

Construction and career
On 6–7 April 1945, Suzutsuki escorted the battleship  from the Inland Sea on her attack mission against the Allied forces fighting on Okinawa. Her bow was torn off by a torpedo from aircraft of Task Force 58, but survived and returned to Sasebo, by steaming in reverse the whole way. Some of the survivors were picked up by Suzutsuki.

Following the end of the war, Suzutsuki'' was initially used as a breakwater at Takamatsu in November 1945, then was sold for scrap that same month after her name was delisted from the Navy List on 20 November.

Notes

References

External links
CombinedFleet.com: Akizuki-class destroyers
CombinedFleet.com: Suzutsuki history

Akizuki-class destroyers (1942)
World War II destroyers of Japan
1942 ships
Ships sunk as breakwaters